The 1993–94 Duke Blue Devils men's basketball team represented Duke University during the 1993–94 NCAA Division I men's basketball season. The head coach was Mike Krzyzewski. The team played its home games in the Cameron Indoor Stadium in Durham, North Carolina, and was a member of the Atlantic Coast Conference.

Having failed to win a third consecutive national championship the season before, the Blue Devils looked to improve on that. Duke finished the regular season #6 in the AP Poll and earned the #2 seed in the Southeast Region, which they won by defeating top-seeded Purdue to advance to the Final Four for the fifth time in six years. The Blue Devils returned to the National Championship Game for the fourth time in five years, but lost to Arkansas.

Roster

Schedule

|-
!colspan=9 style=| Regular seson

|-
!colspan=9 style=| NCAA tournament

|-
!colspan=9 style=| NCAA tournament

Rankings

Awards and honors
Grant Hill, ACC Player of the Year

Team players drafted into the NBA

References

Duke Blue Devils men's basketball seasons
Duke
NCAA Division I men's basketball tournament Final Four seasons
1993 in sports in North Carolina
1994 in sports in North Carolina
Duke